The Curry Fire was a wildfire that burned  of land in Fresno County, California. The fire started burning on July 1, 2016, in the Curry Mountains, seven miles southwest of Coalinga. The cause of the fire is still unknown. The fire temporarily shut down part of highway 198, but there were no reported injuries from the fire and no buildings were damaged.  However, one firefighter had to be treated for overheating by EMS. On July 3 the Fresno Country Sheriff's Department issued an evacuation warning for areas near the Monterey–Fresno county line. Cal Fire officials strongly urged local residents to only use fireworks with the State Fire Marshal seal of approval to help prevent more fires in the area.

See also
2016 California wildfires

References

2016 California wildfires
Wildfires in Fresno County, California